Diadelia is a genus of longhorn beetles of the subfamily Lamiinae, containing the following species:

subgenus Adiadelia
 Diadelia inermicollis Breuning, 1939
 Diadelia nitidipennis Breuning, 1966

subgenus Anadiadelia
 Diadelia albosquamulosa Breuning, 1949

subgenus Congodiadelia
 Diadelia congoana Breuning, 1943

subgenus Diadelia 
 Diadelia affinis Breuning, 1939
 Diadelia albomaculatoides Breuning, 1961
 Diadelia albomarmorata Breuning, 1965
 Diadelia albovittata Breuning, 1957
 Diadelia antegrisea Breuning, 1957
 Diadelia apicalis (Gahan, 1890)
 Diadelia apicefusca Breuning, 1970
 Diadelia atomosparsa Fairmaire, 1904
 Diadelia basifusca Breuning, 1940
 Diadelia basifuscipennis Breuning, 1957
 Diadelia basifuscomaculata Breuning, 1980
 Diadelia betschi Breuning, 1975
 Diadelia bicoloricornis Breuning, 1961
 Diadelia biplagiata Waterhouse, 1882
 Diadelia bispina (Fairmaire, 1904)
 Diadelia bispinipennis Breuning, 1961
 Diadelia bispinosa Breuning, 1939
 Diadelia blanci Breuning, 1975
 Diadelia brunneofasciata Breuning, 1943
 Diadelia cinerascens Fairmaire, 1896
 Diadelia convexicollis (Fairmaire, 1899)
 Diadelia costipennis Fairmaire, 1896
 Diadelia densemarmorata Breuning, 1964
 Diadelia dujardini Breuning, 1970
 Diadelia excavatipennis Breuning, 1965
 Diadelia flavicollis Breuning, 1957
 Diadelia flavovitticollis Breuning, 1966
 Diadelia flavovittipennis Breuning, 1957
 Diadelia geminatoides Breuning, 1961
 Diadelia granulipennis Breuning, 1957
 Diadelia granulithorax Breuning, 1957
 Diadelia grisea Breuning, 1969
 Diadelia griseata Breuning, 1957
 Diadelia griseola Breuning, 1939
 Diadelia grisescens Breuning, 1939
 Diadelia imitatrix Breuning, 1939
 Diadelia iners Fairmaire, 1902
 Diadelia infasciata Breuning, 1957
 Diadelia inornata (Fairmaire, 1905)
 Diadelia interrupta (Fairmaire, 1896)
 Diadelia lateriplagiata Breuning, 1939
 Diadelia lebisi Breuning, 1957
 Diadelia leucovittata Breuning, 1970
 Diadelia lignea Breuning, 1940
 Diadelia ligneoides Breuning, 1961
 Diadelia lineata Breuning, 1943
 Diadelia lineigera (Fairmaire, 1899)
 Diadelia lineolata Breuning, 1939
 Diadelia marmorata Breuning, 1939
 Diadelia marmoratoides Breuning, 1975
 Diadelia nervosa Fairmaire, 1871
 Diadelia nervulata Fairmaire, 1903
 Diadelia nigropunctata Breuning, 1980
 Diadelia obenbergeri Breuning, 1943
 Diadelia oberthuri Breuning, 1957
 Diadelia obliquata Breuning, 1948
 Diadelia obliquefasciata Breuning, 1965
 Diadelia obliquenigrovittata Breuning, 1980
 Diadelia obliquepicta (Fairmaire, 1899)
 Diadelia obliquevittata Breuning, 1961
 Diadelia ochreovittata Breuning, 1970
 Diadelia paracostipennis Breuning, 1970
 Diadelia parapunctifrons Breuning, 1977
 Diadelia parobliquata Breuning, 1975
 Diadelia parvula Breuning, 1939
 Diadelia postalbomaculata Breuning, 1957
 Diadelia puncticollis Breuning, 1940
 Diadelia punctifrons Breuning, 1940
 Diadelia ratovosoni Breuning, 1970
 Diadelia rotundipennis Breuning, 1966
 Diadelia rugicollis Breuning, 1980
 Diadelia strandiella Breuning, 1940
 Diadelia sublinea Breuning, 1970
 Diadelia subnervulata Breuning, 1957
 Diadelia subornata Breuning, 1957
 Diadelia subuniformis Breuning, 1961
 Diadelia transversefasciata Breuning, 1964
 Diadelia truncata (Aurivillius, 1915)
 Diadelia unicolor Breuning, 1970
 Diadelia vadoni Breuning, 1957
 Diadelia vadoniana Breuning, 1957
 Diadelia vagefasciata Fairmaire, 1902
 Diadelia vicina Breuning, 1961
 Diadelia viossati Breuning, 1970
 Diadelia vittipennis Breuning, 1957
 Diadelia x-brunnea Breuning, 1939
 Diadelia x-fasciata Gahan, 1890
 Diadelia x-fascioides Breuning, 1971
 Diadelia x-flava Breuning, 1971
 Diadelia x-fusca Breuning, 1965
 Diadelia x-fuscoides Breuning, 1980
 Diadelia xylina Breuning, 1961

subgenus Guineodiadelia
 Diadelia gabonica Breuning, 1940
 Diadelia guineensis Baguena Corella & Breuning, 1958

subgenus Myodiadelia
 Diadelia albosetosa Breuning, 1953
 Diadelia fuscostictica Baguena Corella & Breuning, 1958
 Diadelia laeviceps Breuning, 1942
 Diadelia longicornis Breuning, 1949
 Diadelia minuscula Breuning, 1940
 Diadelia retrospinosa Breuning, 1961
 Diadelia spinipennis Breuning, 1961
 Diadelia squamulosa Breuning, 1940

subgenus Setodiadelia
 Diadelia holobrunnea Breuning, 1980
 Diadelia laterimaculata Breuning, 1943
 Diadelia setigera Breuning, 1957
 Diadelia setigeroides Breuning, 1980

References

 
Desmiphorini
Cerambycidae genera